The 1966 Australian Touring Car Championship was a CAMS sanctioned Australian motor racing title open to Group C Improved Production Touring Cars. It was contested over a single 20-lap race staged at the Mount Panorama Circuit near Bathurst in New South Wales, Australia on Easter Monday, 11 April 1966, and was the seventh running of the Australian Touring Car Championship. The race was sponsored by the Neptune Oil Company, Sydney.

Ian Geoghegan, driving a Ford Mustang, claimed his second Australian Touring Car Championship title and the first of four consecutive titles that he would achieve in Mustangs.

Race summary
Ian Geoghegan had upgraded to a Ford Mustang and took pole position ahead of Norm Beechey, who had qualified both his Mustang and his new Chevrolet Chevy II Nova. Despite lapping quicker in the Mustang, Beechey elected to race the more powerful Chevy II Nova. Don Smith had qualified sixth in his Holden EH S4, but was unable to start due to an accident in a preliminary race.

Beechey led away from the start and gradually increased his lead during the first half of the 20-lap race, moving 9.6 seconds ahead of Geoghegan by the end of lap 8. Three cars had been retired at this point: T. McGee's Morris Cooper, Malcolm Bailey's Ford Zephyr and Bob Edgerton's Morris Cooper S.

Geoghegan started to reduce the gap on lap 9 and caught Beechey on lap 13 before passing him on lap 14. Terry Allan retired from the race on lap 13 while fellow Holden runner Warren Weldon retired on lap 16 with a broken crankshaft. Beechey's pace dropped off for the remainder of the race, with reported clutch troubles, allowing Geoghegan to take an easy victory. Kevin Bartlett, driving an Alfa Romeo GTA, was the only other driver to finish on the lead lap, albeit nearly two minutes behind Beechey. John Harvey and Phil Barnes completed the top five, one lap down on the leaders.

Results

Notes:
 Class winners are indicated by bold text.
  Norm Beechey qualified in both his Ford Mustang and his Chevrolet Chevy II Nova but chose to race the latter.

Statistics
 Attendance: 20,000
 Pole position: Ian Geoghegan, 2:40.7
 Fastest lap: Ian Geoghegan, 2:40.4 (New record)
 Race distance: 20 laps, 123.44 km
 Winner's average speed: 135.89 km/h

References

External links
 1966 touring car racing images

Australian Touring Car Championship seasons
Touring Cars
Motorsport in Bathurst, New South Wales